"Hard Days and Honky Tonk Nights" is a song co-written and recorded by American country music artist Earl Thomas Conley.  It was released in January 1992 as the third single from the album Yours Truly.  The song reached #36 on the Billboard Hot Country Singles & Tracks chart.  The song was written by Conley and Randy Scruggs.

Chart performance

References

1992 singles
1991 songs
Earl Thomas Conley songs
Songs written by Earl Thomas Conley
Songs written by Randy Scruggs
Song recordings produced by Richard Landis
RCA Records singles